Khitrovka is a rural locality (a selo) in Tomsky Selsoviet of Seryshevsky District, Amur Oblast, Russia. The population was 115 as of 2018. There are 3 streets.

Geography 
Khitrovka is located on the Tom River, 25 km southeast of Seryshevo (the district's administrative centre) by road. Belogorka is the nearest rural locality.

References 

Rural localities in Seryshevsky District